Sri Veera Venkata Satyanarayana Swamy Temple or Annavaram Temple is a Hindu-Vaishnavite temple situated at Annavaram town in Kakinada district, of Andhra Pradesh state, India. The temple is on a hillock named Ratnagiri and is dedicated to Veera Venkata Satyanarayana, an incarnation of Lord Vishnu.

Administration
The temple is being administered under Endowments department of Andhra Pradesh by a Trust board of 13 members.

Architecture
The temple is situated on Ratnagiri hill on the banks of river Pampa. It can be accessed by both foot steps made of stone and by road (3km). The Temple resembles a chariot with four wheels in four corners. The main sanctum is in two floors and main entrance had been gold plated. The temple hosts mandapam to conduct Satyanaraya Vrathams.

Poojas and Festivals
Satyanarayana Vratam

References 

Hindu temples in Kakinada district
Vishnu temples